Ottola Nesmith (December 12, 1889 – February 7, 1972) was an American actress who appeared in more than 100 films and television shows.

Selected filmography

 Still Waters (1915) - Drasa La Rue
 Rich Man, Poor Man (1918) - Mrs. Wynne
 Beyond Price (1921) - Mrs. Temple
 Wife Against Wife (1921) - Florence Bromley
 The Girl-Shy Cowboy (1928) - Girls' College Teacher
 Back Page (1934) - Gertrude Mellon
 Wings in the Dark (1935) - Housekeeper (uncredited)
 Becky Sharp (1935) - Lady Jane Crawley
 She Gets Her Man (1935) - Club Woman (uncredited)
 A Feather in Her Hat (1935) - Susan (uncredited)
 Ship Cafe (1935) - Lady Todhunter (uncredited)
 The Unguarded Hour (1936) - Mrs. Samuel Metford (uncredited)
 Anthony Adverse (1936) - Sister Ursula (uncredited)
 Three Men on a Horse (1936) - Head Nurse
 Flying Hostess (1936) - Passenger (uncredited)
 A Doctor's Diary (1937) - Maternity Ward Nurse (uncredited)
 Nobody's Baby (1937) - Head Nurse
 The Prince and the Pauper (1937) - Lady in Waiting (uncredited)
 Partners in Crime (1937) - Committee Woman (uncredited)
 The Buccaneer (1938) - Dolly Madison's Dinner Guest (uncredited)
 Fools for Scandal (1938) - Agnes
 The Beloved Brat (1938) - Mrs. Higgins (uncredited)
 Keep Smiling (1938) - Woman at Auction (uncredited)
 The Story of Alexander Graham Bell (1939) - Nora (uncredited)
 Undercover Doctor (1939) - Nurse (uncredited)
 The Star Maker (1939) - Elderly Lady
 Television Spy (1939) - Caroline Sheldon
 Miracle on Main Street (1939) - Welfare worker
 Lillian Russell (1940) - Miss Smyth
 Her First Romance (1940) - Mrs. Whiting
 Invisible Ghost (1941) - Mrs. Mason
 Shining Victory (1941) - Nurse (uncredited)
 The Hard-Boiled Canary (1941) - Mrs. Stevens (uncredited)
 Blossoms in the Dust (1941) - Nana, the Governess (uncredited)
 The Deadly Game (1941) - Nazi Wife
 International Squadron (1941) - Mrs. Harris (uncredited)
 When Ladies Meet (1941) - Third Autograph Seeker (uncredited)
 H.M. Pulham, Esq. (1941) - Mrs. Prinkle, Dance School Teacher (uncredited)
 The Wolf Man (1941) - Mrs. Bally (uncredited)
 We Were Dancing (1942) - Mrs. Gertrude Quimby (uncredited)
 Reap the Wild Wind (1942) - Dowager at Tea (uncredited)
 The Great Man's Lady (1942) - Mrs. Frisbee (uncredited)
 This Above All (1942) - Minor Role (uncredited)
 Mrs. Miniver (1942) - Saleslady (uncredited)
 Night in New Orleans (1942) - Elevator Passenger (uncredited)
 Her Cardboard Lover (1942) - Mrs. Burton - Casino Patron (uncredited)
 Journey for Margaret (1942) - Nurse (uncredited)
 The Leopard Man (1943) - Señora Contreras (uncredited)
 Two Tickets to London (1943) - Teacher (uncredited)
 Thumbs Up (1943) - English Matron (uncredited)
 The Man from Down Under (1943) - Minor Role (uncredited)
 The Seventh Victim (1943) - Mrs. Loughwood (uncredited)
 The Return of the Vampire (1943) - Elsa Walter - Governess
 The Story of Dr. Wassell (1944) - Missionary's Wife (uncredited)
 The White Cliffs of Dover (1944) - Orderly in Hospital (uncredited)
 Ministry of Fear (1944) - Woman at Admission Gate (uncredited)
 Casanova Brown (1944) - Patient's Nurse (uncredited)
 Our Hearts Were Young and Gay (1944) - Fur Shop Owner (uncredited)
 Three Sisters of the Moors (1944, Short) - Townswoman (uncredited)
 And Now Tomorrow (1944) - Mrs. Raines (uncredited)
 Practically Yours (1944) - Hysterical Woman in Senate (uncredited)
 Molly and Me (1945) - Lady Alexander (uncredited)
 Love Letters (1945) - Elderly Nurse (uncredited)
 Her Highness and the Bellboy (1945) - Diplomat's Wife (uncredited)
 My Name Is Julia Ross (1945) - Mrs. Robinson (uncredited)
 A Letter for Evie (1946) - Red Cross Nurse (uncredited)
 To Each His Own (1946) - Dora (uncredited)
 Cluny Brown (1946) - Mrs. Tupham (uncredited)
 The Late George Apley (1947) - Madame at Modiste Shop (uncredited)
 Buck Privates Come Home (1947) - French Matron (uncredited)
 Down to Earth (1947) - Dowager ('I adore musicals..') (uncredited)
 Unconquered (1947) - Woman (uncredited)
 Forever Amber (1947) - Mrs. Chiverton (uncredited)
 The Mating of Millie (1948) - Saleswoman (uncredited)
 Julia Misbehaves (1948) - Saleslady (uncredited)
 Boston Blackie's Chinese Venture (1949) - Solicitous Tourist (uncredited)
 A Connecticut Yankee in King Arthur's Court (1949) - Tourist (uncredited)
 Any Number Can Play (1949) - Minor Role (uncredited)
 The Doctor and the Girl (1949) - Martha, Receptionist (uncredited)
 Chicago Deadline (1949) - Sister John (uncredited)
 Chinatown at Midnight (1949) - Mrs. Langdon (uncredited)
 Samson and Delilah (1949) - (uncredited)
 The File on Thelma Jordon (1950) - Mrs. Asher (uncredited)
 My Friend Irma Goes West (1950) - Second Teacher (uncredited)
 Sunset Blvd. (1950) - Minor Role (uncredited)
 Let's Dance (1950) - Wife / Guest (uncredited)
 The Son of Dr. Jekyll (1951) - Nurse (uncredited)
 The Greatest Show on Earth (1952) - Spectator (uncredited)
 Invitation (1952) - Guest (uncredited)
 Scaramouche (1952) - Lady-in-Waiting (uncredited)
 I, the Jury (1953) - Cathy (uncredited)
 Man Crazy (1953) - Mrs. Becker
 The Swan (1956) - Housekeeper (uncredited)
 Something of Value (1957) - Nurse - Nairobi Hospital (uncredited)
 Witness for the Prosecution (1957) - Miss Johnson (uncredited)
 Cheyenne (1960) - as Liza Marley in episode "Alibi for the Scalped Man"
 From the Terrace (1960) - Lady Servringham (uncredited)
 Pigeons from Hell, Boris Karloff's Thriller (1961) - The Zuvembie, Eula Lee Blassenville 
 The Notorious Landlady (1962) - Flower Woman (uncredited)
 The Unsinkable Molly Brown (1964) - Courtiere (uncredited)
 Inside Daisy Clover (1965) - Dolores
 Stagecoach (1966) - Landlady (uncredited)
 The Comic (1969) - Housekeeper (uncredited)

References

External links

1889 births
1972 deaths
American film actresses
American silent film actresses
Actresses from Washington, D.C.
20th-century American actresses